Peter Schickele Presents an Evening with P. D. Q. Bach (1807–1742)? was the first concert of and the first release of the music of Peter Schickele under his comical pseudonym of P. D. Q. Bach by Vanguard Records. The chamber orchestra was conducted by Jorge Mester. The album consists of musical parodies with commentaries by the composer.

Recording
The recording was made at New York's The Town Hall at 8:30 P.M. on Saturday, April 24, 1965. Here, for the first time, the professor discussed his imagined studies of the life and "recently discovered" works of P. D. Q. Bach. Some of New York's finest musicians were on hand to give splendid performances, according to Howard Klein of The New York Times. Klein, realizing this was a one-time concert, hoped that a suitable foundation could be found to fund a nationwide tour.

Schickele made his first concert entrance sliding down a rope from the Town Hall balcony to the orchestra level and then taking the stage. Similar slapstick entrances became de rigueur at subsequent concerts.
 
The album was released as an LP in 1965 (Vanguard VMD 79195), and as a CD in 1987 (Vanguard VBD-79195). The 50th anniversary of this concert was commemorated at the same venue on December 28 and 29, 2015.

Performers
Professor Peter Schickele, Hardart, wine bottle, and ocarina
Chamber orchestra under the direction of Jorge Mester:
John Ferrante, bargain counter tenor
Ralph Froelich, French horn
Leonid Hambro, harpsichord
Seymour Platt, trumpet mouthpiece
Maurice Eisenstadt, bagpipes
Robert Lewis, left-handed sewer flute
Stanley Buetens, lute
Stephen Lickman, double-reed slide music stand
Peter Zolotareff, balalaika

Track listing
Concerto for Horn and Hardart, S.27
Allegro
Tema con variazione
Menuetto con Panna e Zucchero
Cantata: Iphigenia in Brooklyn, S.53162
Aria: "As Hyperion across the flaming sky"
Recitative: "And lo, she found herself within a market"
Ground: "Dying, and yet in death alive"
Recitative: "And in a vision, Iphigenia saw her brother, Orestes"
Aria: "Running knows"
Quodlibet for Small Orchestra (by Peter Schickele)
Allegro
Adagio
Allegro
Sinfonia Concertante, S.98.6

Andante senza moto
Presto

References

External links
An Evening With P.D.Q. Bach (1807-1742)?

P. D. Q. Bach live albums
Albums conducted by Jorge Mester
Albums recorded at the Town Hall
Vanguard Records live albums
1960s comedy albums
1965 debut albums
1965 live albums